Inkosi was the name of two steamships operated by T & J Harrison Ltd
, torpedoed and sunk in 1918, three firemen killed in the engine room.
, bombed and sunk in 1940, salvaged as Empire Chivalry

Zulu words and phrases
Ship names